Frankland railway station served the village of Brasside, County Durham, England, from 1861 to 1877 on the Leamside Line.

History 
The station opened in March 1861 on the North Eastern Railway. It was situated south of where Frankland Prison is today. It was known as Frankland Siding from 1861 to 1868 in the Bradshaw timetables. Goods trains served a nearby colliery as well as a brick works. Trains only ran on Saturdays until towards the end until it became fortnightly and closed in July 1877.

References

External links 

Disused railway stations in County Durham
Former North Eastern Railway (UK) stations
Railway stations in Great Britain opened in 1861
Railway stations in Great Britain closed in 1877
1861 establishments in England
1877 disestablishments in England